Podalyria is a genus of flowering plants in the family Fabaceae. It belongs to the subfamily Faboideae. The genus is endemic to South Africa.

Species
Podalyria comprises the following species:

 Podalyria argentea Salisb.

 Podalyria biflora (Retz.) Lam.

 Podalyria burchellii DC.
 Podalyria buxifolia Willd.
 Podalyria calyptrata (Retz.) Willd.
 Podalyria canescens E. Mey.

 Podalyria cordata R. Br.
 Podalyria cuneifolia Vent.
 Podalyria glauca DC.

 Podalyria hamata E. Mey.
 Podalyria hirsuta (Aiton) Willd.

 Podalyria leipoldtii L. Bolus
 Podalyria microphylla E. Mey.

 Podalyria montana Hutch.
 Podalyria myrtillifolia Willd.

 Podalyria oleaefolia Salisb.
 Podalyria orbicularis E. Mey.
 Podalyria pearsonii E. Phillips

 Podalyria pulcherrima Schinz
 Podalyria racemulosa DC.
 Podalyria reticulata Harv.
 Podalyria rotundifolia (P.J. Bergius) A.L. Schutte
 Podalyria sericea R. Br.

 Podalyria speciosa Eckl. & Zeyh.

 Podalyria uncinata Hutch.

 Podalyria variabilis A.L. Schutte
 Podalyria velutina Benth.

References

Podalyrieae
Fabaceae genera